The Herrenhausen Gardens of Herrenhausen Palace, located in Herrenhausen, an urban district of Lower Saxony's capital of Hanover are made up of the Great Garden, the Berggarten, the Georgengarten and the Welfengarten. The gardens are a heritage of the Kings of Hanover.

The Great Garden has always been one of the most distinguished Baroque gardens of Europe while the Berggarten has been transformed over the years from a simple vegetable garden into a large botanical garden with its own attractions. Both the Georgengarten and the Welfengarten have been made in the style of English gardens, and both are considered popular recreation areas for the residents of Hannover. The history of the gardens spans several centuries, and they remain a popular attraction to this day.

The Great Garden

 

The Great Garden owes much of its aesthetics to Sophia of Hanover, consort of the Elector of Hanover and herself heiress to the British throne, who in 1683 commissioned the French gardener Martin Charbonnier to enlarge an existing garden. It served as a summer retreat, located only a few kilometers outside the city, while the Leineschloss was the main residence in town. As its name implies, it indeed became a large garden, comprising  of lawns, hedges, walkways, and statues arranged in strict geometrical patterns.

The centerpiece of the garden is the rather small Herrenhausen Palace, originally a manor house of 1640 which had been enlarged since 1676. Whereas Sophia's husband, Ernest Augustus, Elector of Brunswick-Luneburg, planned its replacement with a large baroque palace, and began constructions with the nearby grand Gallery Building, their son, elector George Louis, who in 1714 succeeded to the British throne as King George I, gave the palace project up and concentrated on water features. Sophia, Ernest Augustus and George I are buried in the mausoleum in the Berggarten.

The next king, George II, planned again for a new palace in better proportion with the Great Garden, but never realized it. His successor George III, who never visited Herrenhausen, had the palace modernized in neoclassical style by  Laves. It suffered immense damage during World War II (the Royal Air Force were requested by the British Royal Family not to attack the palace, at the time still owned by the House of Hanover, but in fact it was hit by bombs during an air raid in 1943). The ruins of the palace were almost completely torn down after the war; the outside staircase once leading up to the entrance was salvaged from the debris and moved next to the Orangerie building where it can be seen today. In 2009, it was decided to rebuild the palace. Herrenhausen Palace was reopened on 17 January 2013.

Every summer, the Great Garden plays host a large variety of festivals. The "Festival of Small Arts" takes place over several days and offers a wide range of artistic displays, and the "Small Festival in the Great Garden" has become firmly entrenched as a highlight of the "Festival Week Herrenhausen". Lastly, the garden is the site of an international fireworks competition which evolved from a local attraction.

The "State Stage of Hanover" uses the Garden Theatre of the Great Garden during the summer for both musicals and other theatrical performances. Similarly, the building that houses the garden's orangery is utilized for both art exhibits and performances of classical music; matinee performances are presented in the foyer. The fountain and its pumping works were renewed in 1860.

The Great Garden is also the site of one of the last works of the artist Niki de Saint Phalle. She modified the three-roomed grotto in the northwestern section of the garden, which had served as a store room in the eighteenth century, by adding various items, including crystals, minerals, glass and seashells. Between 2001 and 2003, when the exhibit opened, de Saint Phalle and her coworkers covered the walls and interior with mosaics of molded glass and mirrors. Two rooms branch off from the octagon-shaped central room, and on the front wall of each of them is a statue set within a small recession in the wall. De Saint Phalle's intention for this exhibit was that the visitors could use the grotto as a cool retreat on hot summer days while at the same time being enchanted by the decorations.

The Berggarten

The Berggarten (Mountain Garden) was created in 1666 as a vegetable garden for the Great Garden on a hill north of the Herrenhäuser Castle. Sophia of Hanover later transformed the Berggarten into a garden for exotic plants, and in 1686 a conservatory was erected.

The garden once served more than an aesthetic purposeit was used to experiment with the breeding of plants normally native to southern lands in the northern climate of Lower Saxony. This experiment failed in its attempts to grow rice, but was successful with some other plants such as tobacco and mulberry. As a result, the silkworms located in the nearby city of Hamelin which were used in production of royal silk began to be fed with Herrenhäuser mulberry leaves in 1706.

Between 1817 and 1820, a caretaker's hut was built on the garden's grounds. In 1846, work began on the "Palm-house", a conservatory designed by architect Georg Ludwig Friedrich Laves and containing, as the name implies, palm trees. Within five years of its completion in 1849, the building housed the most valuable and extensive collection of palms in all of Europe. Work on the garden's mausoleum, also designed by Laves, lasted from 1842 to 1847; King Ernest Augustus, who died one year after completion, was interred there with his wife Queen Frederica.

It was also around this time (1845 to 1846) that walls and fences were added in order to make the  more secluded. In 1880, a larger building for the palm collection was built. Taking the form of a roughly  palace-like structure, the greenhousebuilt out of glass and steelhouses both galleries and decorative fountains and replaced the previous . Much of the garden had to be rebuilt bit by bit after British air raids destroyed much of the city in World War II. In 1952, the Garden Librarywhich now houses the garden's managementwas built, and in 1957, further members of the Royal Family of Hanover, including King George I of Great Britain and his parents, were interred in the garden's mausoleum, after destruction of the Leineschloss and its chapel during World War II. Among them are the remains of John Frederick, Duke of Brunswick-Luneburg, his daughter Anna Sophie (1670–1672), Ernest Augustus, Elector of Brunswick-Luneburg and his wife Sophia of the Palatinate, their younger son Ernest Augustus, Duke of York and Albany and Princess Charlotte of Clarence (1819–1819), daughter of William IV of the United Kingdom. In front of the mausoleum are the graves of Ernest Augustus, Duke of Brunswick and his wife Princess Viktoria Luise of Prussia.

The year 2000 saw the completion of a brand new "Rainforest-house", partially as a replacement for the legendary  (which was demolished in 1950) and partially for the Expo 2000. Inside is a tropical landscape containing more than plantsdifferent species of tropical butterflies and birds were also incorporated into the environment. Further exhibits of the building include several displays themed gardens.

The Georgengarten

Welfengarten

The  (Welf Garden) makes up the grounds of the University of Hannover, as the university now uses the gothic revival castle at the garden's centre as its main building. Its construction began in 1857, however, before it was completed, Hanover was annexed by Prussia in 1866. In the following years the building was accomplished in its present form. In front of the building is a bronze sculpture of the Lower Saxony Steedthe heraldic animal found on the coat of arms of Lower Saxony. The , like the other gardens, was also destroyed during the Second World War, but it was rebuilt specifically as the campus of the university. He kept however the Princely House, located near the Great Garden and built by King George I of Great Britain for his daughter Anna Louise in 1720, for himself. His grandson Prince Ernst August of Hanover uses it as his private residence today. The museum in this small palace, with an elaborate furniture collection, has therefore been closed.

See also
 List of botanical gardens in Germany

References

External links

 Official site
 Botanical Garden - Berggarten
 Pictures by Anna Levitskaia (www.levitski.com)
 Princely House (Fürstenhaus)

German Baroque gardens
Gardens in Lower Saxony
Buildings and structures in Hanover
1666 establishments in the Holy Roman Empire
Tourist attractions in Hanover